Hillersleben is a village and a former municipality in the Börde district in Saxony-Anhalt, Germany. A large proving ground for artillery operated there from 1934 to 1945. Since 1 January 2010, it is part of the municipality Westheide.

References

Former municipalities in Saxony-Anhalt
Börde (district)